Manduca empusa is a moth of the  family Sphingidae. It is known from Venezuela.

References

Manduca
Moths described in 1965